Joseph Chesire (born November 12, 1957) is a former Kenyan middle-distance runner who represented his country in the 1984, 1988 and 1992 Summer Olympics. He came fourth in Los Angeles and Barcelona. Cheshire also won the 1500 m at the London Grand Prix in 1992. His greatest indoor achievement was the bronze medal at the 1985 IAAF World Indoor Games.

He became the oldest entrant into the 1500 metres at the World Championships in Athletics, at 35 years, 281 days at the 1993 edition.

International competitions

References

External links

Living people
1957 births
Kenyan male middle-distance runners
Olympic athletes of Kenya
Athletes (track and field) at the 1984 Summer Olympics
Athletes (track and field) at the 1988 Summer Olympics
Athletes (track and field) at the 1992 Summer Olympics
World Athletics Championships athletes for Kenya
African Games bronze medalists for Kenya
African Games medalists in athletics (track and field)
Athletes (track and field) at the 1987 All-Africa Games
World Athletics Indoor Championships medalists